Nicaragüense de Aviación (also known as NICA) was an airline based in Nicaragua. Its main hub was the Augusto C. Sandino International Airport. The commercial airline was a full associate member of the Grupo TACA alliance of El Salvador.

History
NICA was founded in 1992 from the remains of Aeronica and commenced operations from Managua to Miami. In 1994, the Grupo TACA acquired 49% of NICA and reorganized the airline without government intervention. 

In 2004, the airline ceased operations and merged with TACA Airlines. Its domestic flight duties were given to Nicaragua's domestic flag carrier, La Costeña, who also joined the TACA Regional alliance. La Costeña however, differs from NICA because it still operates under its company name.

Destinations

San José (Juan Santamaría International Airport)

San Salvador (El Salvador International Airport)

Guatemala City (La Aurora International Airport)
 

Managua (Augusto C. Sandino International Airport) Hub
Bluefields (Bluefields Airport)
Puerto Cabezas (Puerto Cabezas Airport)
Corn Island (Corn Island Airport)

Panama City (Tocumen International Airport)

Miami (Miami International Airport)

Fleet
NICA formerly operated the following aircraft:

2 Boeing 737-200
1 CASA C-212 Aviocar

See also
List of defunct airlines of Nicaragua

References

External links
 Airliners.net Search
 Airline memorabilia: Nica (1994)

Defunct airlines of Nicaragua
Airlines established in 1992
Airlines disestablished in 2004
Companies disestablished in 2004

es:Aeronica
Grupo TACA